Brahmaea is a genus of moths of the family Brahmaeidae. Acanthobrahmaea, Brahmidia, and Brachygnatha are synonyms. Acanthobrahmaea has sometimes been considered a subgenus, describing an endemic relict species that only occurs in the vicinity of the Monte Vulture in Italy.

Species
Brachygnatha diastemata, found in China (Shaanxi).Zhang & Yang, 1993
Brahmaea ardjoeno (Kalis, 1934)
Brahmaea celebica Toxopeus, 1939
Brahmaea certhia (Fabricius, 1793)
Brahmaea christophi Staudinger, 1879
Brahmaea hearseyi (White, 1862)
Brahmaea japonica (Butler, 1873)
Brahmaea ledereri (Rogenhofer, 1873)
Brahmaea litserra H.L. Hao, X.R. Zhang & J.K. Yang, 2002
Brahmaea loeffleri Naumann & Brosch, 2005
Brahmaea naessigi Naumann & Brosch, 2005
Brahmaea paukstadtorum Naumann & Brosch, 2005
Brahmaea tancrei (Austaut, 1896)
Brahmaea wallichii (Gray, 1831)
Brahmidia polymehntas H.L. Hao, X.R. Zhang & J.K. Yang, 2002

References

Further reading

 , 1982: Eine neue population von Brahmaea ledereri Rogenhofer, 1873, (Brahmaea ledereri zaba ssp. n.) in Türkisch-Kurdistan, sowie nachweis der konspezifität von Brahmaea ledereri Rogenhofer, 1873, und Brahmaea christophi Staudinger, 1879 (Lepidoptera: Brahmaeidae). Entomofauna 3 (9): 129-139. Full article: .
 , 2002: Two new species of Brahmaeidae from China (Lepidoptera: Brahmaeidae). Acta Entomologica Sinica 45 (Suppl.): 53-55. Full article: 
 , 2005: Zur verbreitung der hearseyi-Gruppe  (Lepidoptera: Brahmaeidae: Brahmaea Walker, 1855) in Indonesien und auf den Philippinen. Galathea 21 (2): 97-104.

Brahmaeidae
Macrolepidoptera genera